Crenicichla isbrueckeri is a species of cichlid native to South America. It is found in the Amazon River basin and in the Aripuanã River basin.

The fish is named in honor of ichthyologist Isaäc J.H. Isbrücker (b. 1944), of the Zoölogisch Museum in Amsterdam.

References

Ploeg, A., 1991. Revision of the South American cichlid genus Crenicichla Heckel, 1840, with description of fifteen new species and consideration on species groups, phylogeny and biogeography (Pisces, Perciformes, Cichlidae). Univ. Amsterdam, Netherlands,153 p. Ph.D. dissertation.

isbrueckeri
Fish of the Amazon basin
Taxa named by Alex Ploeg
Fish described in 1991